Strawberry Shortcake's Berry Bitty Adventures is a CGI animated television series based on the Strawberry Shortcake franchise. The series, produced by MoonScoop Group (2010–2013) and Splash Entertainment (2015), follows the adventures of Strawberry and her friends who live in the fictional land of Berry Bitty City. The series aired from 2010 to 2015. The show is the third iteration of the franchise overall, following the 1980s specials, and the second television series after its 2003 relaunch. It features songs with music by Andy Street and lyrics by Judy Rothman. The series is produced using Autodesk Maya 3D software.

Main characters

Strawberry Shortcake
Voiced by: Anna Cummer (speaking voice) and Tracey Moore (singing voice)

Strawberry Shortcake is a chef and the owner of Berry Bitty Café. She has red-pink hair with a strawberry hat, with a green strawberry clip with a white stripe underneath, and has bright green eyes. She wears a white T-shirt with two green diamonds, and a strawberry in the middle over a pink skirt with red polka dots with green and white striped tights and red Mary Janes. She has a strawberry symbol. She is confident, considerate, optimistic, thoughtful, resourceful, enthusiastic, and full of ideas. Her cat is Custard and her dog is Pupcake.

Orange Blossom
Voiced by: Janyse Jaud

Orange Blossom is a store manager and the owner of Orange Mart. She has chocolate brown hair and brown-orange eyes. She wears a white blouse with frills, an orange-and-peach-colored top with a white line containing an orange in a flower, a white belt with an orange line in the middle, a skirt resembling orange slices, a pair of light orange and white striped leggings, a pair of colored-peach boots with hot pink soles and orange ornaments, and a camellia flower clip with an orange in the center on the hair. She has an orange symbol. She is clever, energetic, ingenious, sporty, adventurous, caring, and always ready to lend a hand. Her dog is Marmalade.

Lemon Meringue
Voiced by: Andrea Libman

Lemon Meringue is a hairstylist and the owner of the Lemon Beauty Salon. She has sunshine yellow hair in pigtails with green bow and blue-green eyes. She wears a yellow sweater with white cuffs, a white undershirt, a light blue skirt with light yellow and white striped leggings, yellow Mary Janes, and a lemon clip on her hair. She has a lemon symbol. She is creative, stylish, girly, and a quick-thinker who can fix any hair problem, such as a bad hair day. Her dog is Henna.

Blueberry Muffin
Voiced by: Britt McKillip

Blueberry Muffin is a bookworm and the owner of Blueberry Bookstore. She has indigo blue hair and sky blue eyes. She wears a blue cardigan over a light blue shirt with deep blue dots, a blue skirt with green and white striped tights, blue shoes with pink lace, and a blue headband with a blueberry on it in her hair. She has a blueberry symbol. She is smart, intelligent, diligent, and is quick to think about a problem first. Her dog is Scouty.

Raspberry Torte
Voiced by: Ingrid Nilson

Raspberry Torte is a fashion designer and the owner of Raspberry Boutique. She has magenta pink hair and lavender pink eyes. She wears a purple bolero over a deep pink dress with a light green long sleeves with light pink and white striped leggings, purple Mary Janes with a light pink strap, a raspberry bracelet, and a green headband with a raspberry on it on the hairstyle. She has a raspberry symbol. She is fashionable, friendly, polite, and cares a lot about her fashions as much as her friends. Her dog is Chiffon.

Plum Pudding
Voiced by: Ashleigh Ball

Plum Pudding is a dancer and the owner of Plum Dance Studio. She has amethyst purple hair in a ponytail worn with a plum clip and amethyst purple eyes. She wears a violet cardigan over a light purple and light blue dance dress, light purple and white striped tights, and light purple ballet slippers with violet legwarmers. She has a plum symbol. She is active, charming, quirky, humorous, kind-hearted, agile, and believes there's something to dance about. Her dog is Pitterpatch.

Cherry Jam
Voiced by: Shannon Chan-Kent (speaking voice) and Victoria Duffield (singing voice)

Cherry Jam is a singer-songwriter and musician. She is a superstar performer, who becomes friends with the group in the second season. While on hiatus from performing, she decided to stay in town with the girls, instead of returning to stardom. She has indigo hair and lavender blue eyes. She wears a pink dress with purple dots inside and a flower with a cherry hanging down, purple and pink striped leggings, pink flats, and a bright pink headband with the same flower as an extension clip on her hair. She has as a cherry symbol. She was once seen carrying a microphone with her and sometimes sings duets with her friends. Her dog is Cinnapup. When she was singing in the world tour, her hair was sprinkled with sparkling glitter and a very small pink glitz-star shaped tattoo on her right cheek.

Huckleberry Pie
Voiced by: Aidan Drummond

Huckleberry Pie is the owner of a pet adoption service. He drives from town to town in Huck's Pup Mobile, getting dogs adopted, and has an animal shelter in Berry Big City. He has brown-orange hair and brown eyes. He wears a dark blue T-shirt with an image of Huckleberries on it over a green and white striped long sleeve shirt, light brown pants, and dark blue shoes. He has a huckleberry symbol. His dog is Tom Tom. Most of the girls adopted puppies from Huckleberry.

Sweet Grapes and Sour Grapes
Voiced by: Andrea Libman (Sweet Grapes) and Diana Kaarina (Sour Grapes)

Sweet Grapes and Sour Grapes are twin sisters. 
  
Sweet Grapes has fuchsia pink hair and mauve eyes. She wears a white and purple striped shirt, a light blue skirt with lilac and white striped tights, white shoes, a white bow with a grape on it on her hair, and black ledged glasses. She has a symbol of a purple grape. She is a chef who comes from an anonymous place. She loves sweets things as she bakes them. She has a kind and sweet personality, much to her sister's annoyance.

Sour Grapes has short violet hair with green streaks and light-purple-and-green eyes. She wears a green-and-purple dress with black sleeves with black and white striped tights, black boots, and a matching headband with a grape on it on her hair. Her icon is a green grape. She is a chef who comes from an anonymous place. She prefers sour things and likes to bake. She has a tart personality and often finds her sister annoyingly pleasant.

Apple Dumplin
Voiced by: Rebecca Shoichet

Apple Dumplin is Strawberry Shortcake's cousin. She has teal blue eyes and yellow-orange hair, with both a red wool hat and apple clip in it. She wears a yellow waistcoat, a white short-sleeve T-shirt, a red skirt with yellow plaids, yellow and white leggings, and pink boots. She has symbol of an apple. She is a world traveler from Strawberryland. Her turtle is Teatime.

Broadcast
The series first premiered outside of the United States. In February 2010, American Greetings pre-sold the series to Playhouse Disney France and M6 in France, Cartoon Network in the UK to air on their Cartoonito channel, Playhouse Disney Canada and Playhouse Disney Latin America.

The series would eventually make its domestic debut on The Hub (currently known as Discovery Family) in 2010. It can also be viewed in Spanish on Discovery Familia.

The series currently airs in Canada on Family Jr. It can be also seen on Discovery Kids in Latin America.

On September 1, 2008 Toon Disney Premiered Strawberry Shortcake's Berry Bitty Adventures and on Disney XD and Disney Channel. "Strawberry Shortcake's Berry Bitty Adventures" Is Also Airing on Disney XD on Disney Channel, TeleXitos, Toonami, Jetix on ABC, And Others On September 15, 2007, Cartoon Network Premiered "Strawberry Shortcake's Berry Bitty Adventures" on Originally Aired Channels

Episodes

Film

The Strawberry Shortcake Movie: Sky's the Limit is a 2009 film that began the series. It is also known as the pilot for the Berry Bitty Adventures series.

Merchandise
To coincide with the relaunch of the franchise, a toy line was produced by Hasbro and later The Bridge Direct, which were both known simply as "Strawberry Shortcake".

Home media
In the United States, as with the 2003 series, 20th Century Fox Home Entertainment distributed DVDs of this series, as well. Season 2 is the only season completely released on DVD, as the rest of the seasons are all missing an episode. Later DVDs also include digital download codes.

In France, M6 Video released the series onto DVD, including complete series boxsets.

References

External links

 

Strawberry Shortcake
2010 American television series debuts
2015 American television series endings
2010s American animated television series
American children's animated adventure television series
American children's animated education television series
American children's animated fantasy television series
American computer-animated television series
Animated television series reboots
English-language television shows
Cartoonito original programming
Family Jr. original programming
Discovery Family original programming
Television series by Splash Entertainment
Television shows based on Hasbro toys
Film and television memes